Israeli athletes have participated in the  Paralympic Games since 1960.

History

Israel first competed in 1960, at the Summer Games in Rome, Italy.  In total, Israel has won 123 gold medals at the Summer Paralympic Games. 

The most successful Israeli Paralympian was Zipora Rubin-Rosenbaum, who, between 1964 and 1988, won 30 medals at the Paralympic Games, of which 15 were gold. Second successful Israeli Paralympian was Uri Bergman, who, between 1976 and 1988, won 14 medals at the Paralympic Games, of which 12 were gold.

Tel Aviv was the host city of the 1968 Summer Paralympics, at which Israel finished third on the medal chart with 62 medals, of which 18 were gold. Israel is the only nation to have hosted Paralympic but not Olympic Games.

At the 2004 Summer Paralympics in Athens, Israelis won a total of thirteen medals, of which four were gold. Izhak Mamistvalov won three medals (of which two were gold) in swimming, while Keren Leibowitz won four medals, of which one was gold, also in swimming.

Israel made its debut at the Winter Paralympics in March 2022.

Medal tables

 Host nation

Source:

Multi-medallists

See also
Paralympic competitors for Israel
Sports in Israel
Israel at the Olympics

References